Aleksey Tolstoy may refer to:

Count Aleksey Konstantinovich Tolstoy (1817–1875), Russian historical and dramatical novelist, poet, playwright
Aleksey Nikolayevich Tolstoy (1883–1945), Russian science-fiction, fantasy and historical writer

Tolstoy family